The genus Natalus of funnel-eared bats is found from Mexico to Brazil and the Caribbean islands. They are slender bats with unusually long tails and, as their name suggests, funnel-shaped ears. They are small, at only 3.5 to 5.5 cm in length, with brown, grey, yellow, or reddish fur. Their tail is completely enclosed in the interfemoral membrane. Adult males have a natalid organ, a large glad-like organ, on the muzzle or face. Their skulls are delicate and extended. They have swollen, rounded braincase and narrow, somewhat tubular rostrum. They have nineteen teeth on both sides, with two upper and three lower being incisors, one upper and lower canine, three upper and lower premolars, and three upper and lower molars. Like many other bats, they are insectivorous, and roost in caves. The genus is similar to the Furipteridae and Thyropteridae genera. All three genera have mostly the same geographic ranges.

Eight species belong to this genus, with cranial and external differences:

Etymology
The genus name Natalus is derived form the Latin word meaning "related to one's birth." The name was chosen because the bats of this genus are small and look like newborns even as adults.

References

 
Bat genera
Taxa named by John Edward Gray
Taxonomy articles created by Polbot